Witold Rodziński (5 October 1918 – 18 December 1997) was a Polish historian, sinologist and diplomat.

He was born in 1918 in Lemberg, son of the conductor Artur Rodziński. He studied at the Columbia University, was an official at the United Nations 1945–47, and adviser in the Ministry of Foreign Affairs 1947–48, a researcher at the Institute of Social Sciences and the Central Committee of the Higher School of Pedagogy in Warsaw.

From 1958 to 1971 he was assistant professor at the Department of History of the University of Warsaw.

He was the Polish Ambassador to the United Kingdom 1960–65 and to the People's Republic of China 1966–69.

Rodziński was the author of the monumental History of China, published in English as The Walled Kingdom: A History of China from Antiquity to the Present.

He died in December 1997, aged 79.

Bibliography 
 Ludwik Bazylow (ed.), Wykaz profesorów i docentów Uniwersytetu Warszawskiego. Dane biograficzne, „Roczniki Uniwersytetu Warszawskiego”, tom 10, 1971, p. 101.

Ambassadors of Poland to the United Kingdom
Ambassadors of Poland to China
20th-century Polish historians
Polish male non-fiction writers
Historians of China
1918 births
1997 deaths
Polish sinologists
Columbia University alumni
Academic staff of the University of Warsaw
Politicians from Lviv
Diplomats from Lviv
Polish expatriates in the United States